Deh-e Hoseyn may refer to:
 Deh-e Hoseyn, Markazi